Hollybush is a residential area of Malpas within the city of Newport, South Wales, United Kingdom.

Location 
Hollybush is situated off Malpas Road in Newport and famous for the Monmouthshire and Brecon Canal that runs through it.

Amenities and history 
The neighbourhood contains The Harvester, The Spar, Kok's Wok Chinese Takeaway and Mint and Mango Indian Takeaway. The area is also home to around 400 inhabitants who are closely situated to Malpas Road, one of the busiest roads in Newport.

The area consists of the streets of Hollybush Avenue, Hollybush Close, Coolgreany Crescent, Coolgreany Close, and Westfield Way.

Government 
The area is governed by the Newport City Council.

External links

Districts of Newport, Wales